Persis S. Drell  is an American physicist best known for her expertise in the field of particle physics.  She was the director of the SLAC National Accelerator Laboratory from 2007 to 2012. She was dean of the Stanford University School of Engineering from 2014 until 2017. Drell became the Provost of Stanford University on February 1, 2017.

Early life and education
The daughter of noted physicist Sidney Drell, Persis Drell grew up on the Stanford University campus. She earned a Bachelor of Arts in mathematics and physics from Wellesley College and a Ph.D. in atomic physics from University of California, Berkeley, studying under Eugene Commins. She completed her postdoctoral work in high-energy physics at Lawrence Berkeley National Laboratory.

Career
She joined the physics faculty at Cornell University in 1988.

Stanford University
In 2002, Drell was hired as associate director of research at the SLAC National Accelerator Laboratory (then known as the Stanford Linear Accelerator Center) where she oversaw the BaBar experiment. In 2007, she was named the fourth director of SLAC, succeeding Jonathan M. Dorfan.

In November 2011, she announced her intention to step down as the head of SLAC and return to a position as a faculty member at Stanford.

In September 2014, Drell became the ninth dean of the Stanford University School of Engineering, the first woman to serve in that role.

In February 2017, Drell became the thirteenth provost of Stanford University.

In March 2019, in response to the 2019 college admissions bribery scandal, Drell announced that all varsity athletic recruits proposed by a Stanford coach for an athletic recommendation will face a background check from a Stanford Athletics executive.

In May 2019, Drell released the Provost's Statement on Diversity and Inclusion.

Controversy
In 2019, Drell's administration began a cost-cutting agenda beginning with a proposal to discontinue funds for Stanford University Press, sparking controversy. Following outcry from students and faculty, Drell agreed to a stop-gap measure to fund the press for one additional year.

References

External links
 Oral history interview transcript with Persis Drell on 4 May 2020, American Institute of Physics, Niels Bohr Library & Archives
 

1955 births
Living people
Place of birth missing (living people)
21st-century American physicists
Particle physicists
American women physicists
Provosts of Stanford University
Stanford University Department of Physics faculty
Cornell University faculty
University of California, Berkeley alumni
Wellesley College alumni
Members of the United States National Academy of Sciences
Hewlett Foundation
American women academics
21st-century American women scientists